Paul Yong Choo Kiong (born 23 September 1970), is a Malaysian politician who served as Member of the Perak State Legislative Assembly (MLA) for Tronoh from May 2013 to November 2022 and Member of the Perak State Executive Council (EXCO) in the Pakatan Harapan (PH) state administration under former Menteri Besar Ahmad Faizal Azumu from May 2018 to the collapse of the PH state administration in March 2020. He is a member of the Parti Bangsa Malaysia (PBM) and was a member of the Malaysian United Indigenous Party (BERSATU), a component party of the state ruling Perikatan Nasional (PN) coalition and of the Democratic Action Party (DAP), a component party of the PH opposition coalition.

On 7 December 2021, the High Court ordered Paul Yong to enter his defence for the charge of raping his former Indonesian maid two years ago. He was found guilty of the offence on 27 July, 2022 and was sentenced to 13 years jail and two lashes of the cane.

Personal life
Paul Yong Choo Kiong was born in Sitiawan, Perak. His family were settlers of the new village program introduced during the British rule of Malaya.

Education and professional career

Yong received his education from SJKC Pei Min Ayer Tawar, and subsequently from SMK Ambrose, Ayer Tawar as well as Nan Hua High School of Ayer Tawar. He also obtained a master's degree in Business Administration from a correspondence University name Akamai, although pronounced by opposition politician Wee Ka Siong that the degree obtained by Yong is a part of a degree mill.

Political career
Entering politics in 2004, Yong quickly became the Political Secretary to Ngeh Koo Ham in the Sitiawan Branch of DAP. Yong stood as the State Assemblyman candidate in the 2013 Malaysian general election, and won in the state seat of Tronoh in Perak. As the incumbent, Yong retained the seat in the 2018 Malaysian general election (GE14), beating his closest rival Yuen Chan How, from MCA, by 10,501 votes. With his win in the GE14, he was appointed a Perak state Exco member, serving in the PH state government under Chief Minister (Menteri Besar), Ahmad Faizal Azumu.

Controversies and issues

Accused of rape
In August 2019, it was arraigned in Ipoh Sessions Court under Section 376 of the indictment on the charge of Yong raping his maid in a room on the top floor of Meru Road 2, Meru Village Park, between 8.15 and 9.15 pm on 7 July 2019. Allegations first arose around early July and despite having police investigations returned, it was resubmitted to the Attorney General Chambers for charges, resulting in Yong being charged in the Ipoh Sessions Court for rape of his house-helper. It then emerged that there was 'third party' involvement and Ngeh Koo Ham publicly saying that he had met the person who was paid to make the police report along with the house-helper. Despite an official request from the legal defense team to expedite the case and have it transferred to the high court for a faster hearing, the high court denied the transfer, requesting it be heard in the sessions court instead. The victim was kept under the witness protection act at the Indonesian Embassy of Kuala Lumpur, and despite pleas from the mother of the victim, was denied visitation rights while during case management, the defense had also appealed to the prosecution to withdraw the case, citing the chemist's report that indicated no traces of his DNA was ever found on clothing items, as well as in bodily fluids of the swab from the alleged victim, but the prosecution claimed that they had other testimonies that could link Yong to the charge.

Third Party Involvement 
Yong opted to go on leave when pressure was stepped up calling for him to take leave-of-absence despite earlier rejecting the advise of the Chief Minister (Menteri Besar). Although he did proceed with the leave-of-absence, Yong returned to duty at the Perak State Legislative Assembly seating between 16 and 22 November. It was then alleged that Perak DAP chairman Nga Kor Ming was overheard in a recording chiding Yong for his initiative to return to work, further compounding the rumour that 'black hands' were behind the accusation. Allegations emerged during Yong's appearance in court when a few hundred of his supporters emerged to call for the resignation of Nga.

Urges of calm and support 
Despite his defense claim and emergence of third party involvement, Yong released a press statement urging his supporters to continue their support of the party and its leaders. Other developments relating to this included the earlier resignation of two state assemblymen for Malim Nawar, Leong Cheok Keng and Pokok Assam, Leow Thye Yih in protest to Nga's statement of Party's decision on Yong's fate rather than the Party's state committee. However both then relented and returned to the state committee on Yong's continued appeal. Both were then denied reinstatement with Nga publicly rebutting 'members who fail to toe party's line'

House broken into 
On 5 November 2019, Yong reported that his house was broken into while he was away on business, resulting in the loss of important documents as well as personal property. Oddly, the room in which his former house-helper stayed in was left locked and untouched. The police confirmed that there was indeed a break in at Yong's house, and while two safe-boxes containing documents and valuables were taken, neither his high powered motorcycle, 60-inch TV nor other expensive items were taken.

Some News Publications of the Evidences and Testimonies during the Rape Trial

On 5 April 2021, in the beginning of the trial, the Public Prosecutor said in his opening statement that medical expert would be called to prove the rape took place, and that the Prosecution would also present evidence on sexual harassment before the rape took place, such as hugging and molest.

On 12 July 2021, the trial judge was told by the police investigating officer that 8 spots believed to be semen stains were found on a mattress cover. He said among the items taken from the incident scene were a mop, a man’s grey underwear, clothing, a pair of blue shorts, a pink underwear and a pair of blue bra.

The Investigation Officer also told the Court that the victim had mopped semen stains off the floor. That is why they took the mop for investigation.

However, on 17 August 2021, when the Chemist gave evidence, it was reported that no traces of semen were detected on the clothing, mop or mattress sent for analysis.

On 7 December 2021, the trial judge ruled that the Prosecution has proven a prima facie case against Yong and ordered Yong to enter his defence. In His Lordship’s ruling, he said 2 elements had been proven by the Prosecution witnesses that the allegation of rape had taken place. The first element was the penetration, as evidence was given by an obstetrician and gynaecologist that a fresh abrasion to the victim’s posterior fourchette caused by the possibility of penetration by a blunt object or organ. The Second element was that the accused had sex without the victim’s consent and that the victim’s statements were consistent.

Yong’s defence counsel has called 3 witnesses, of which Yong himself testified that it was a political ploy to frame him, while his second witness was his wife (Madam Too Choon Lai), who testified that on that day the 2 of them were together with Yong’s friend at the house , and at all material time, Yong was with his friend (who was not called as a witness) and the wife was only away from the home for 10 minutes with the son for a McDonald’s run, and that the alleged incident could not have taken place in that 10 minutes. Yong’s wife also testified that after Yong’s friend left, they chatted in the kitchen, headed upstairs to shower, had sex, and fell asleep.Yong’s wife also refuted Prosecution’s suggestion that her testimony was merely a cover-up to save her husband.

When Yong’s defence counsel asked her to explain why she had shot down Prosecution’s suggestion, Yong’s wife replied, “I did not agree because I’m here today to tell the truth and I would not side with my husband if he had committed any act which is wrong in the eyes of the law.”

When delivering the guilty verdict, the High Court Judge said that the court had found the victim to be credible and honest, adding that her testimony was convincing. In contrast, the Judge said the defence witnesses’ testimonies appeared to have elements of afterthoughts. “Also the point raised about a political ploy against the accused cannot be proved by the defence team,” he said.

Found Guilting of Rape, sentence 13 years & 2 strokes of the cane

On 27 July 2022, the Tronoh assemblyman Paul Yong Choo Kiong was sentenced to 13 years’ jail and two strokes of caning by the High Court here on Wednesday (July 27), after he was found guilty of raping his maid in 2019.

Judge Datuk Abdul Wahab Mohamed handed down the sentence on Yong, after finding that the defence had failed to raise reasonable doubt at the end of its case.

However, the court allowed Yong’s application for a stay of execution pending appeal.

Election results

References
38. https://www.theedgemarkets.com/article/tronoh-assemblyman-paul-yong-gets-13-years-jail-whipping-raping-maid

External links 
 

Living people
1970 births
People from Perak
Malaysian people of Chinese descent
Malaysian United Indigenous Party politicians
Independent politicians in Malaysia
Democratic Action Party (Malaysia) politicians
Members of the Perak State Legislative Assembly
Perak state executive councillors
21st-century Malaysian politicians